Thomas J. Donohue Sr. (born 1938) is the former President and CEO of the United States Chamber of Commerce located in Washington, D.C. The Chamber of Commerce supports pro-business causes and is the largest and oldest trade association in the United States. The Chamber is the largest lobbying group in the U.S., spending more money than any other lobbying organization on a yearly basis. Donohue was the Chamber's president and CEO from 1997 to 2021.

Career 
Born in Brooklyn to a production manager at the American Can Company,  Donohue was raised on Long Island and studied at St. John's University, before pursuing an MA in Business at Adelphi University (1965). His grandfather worked for New York City and was a member of the Tammany Hall machine. He worked his way through college as a union truck driver before working as a fundraiser for the Boy Scouts of America and the National Center for Disability Services. Henry Viscardi, the group's founder, says that when he met Donohue, "I sat him down across the desk from me and asked what job he wanted to have down the road. He said, `I want your job.' That's Tom Donohue for you.”

He worked as an administrator at Fairfield University (1967–69) and as a trustee at Marymount University. From 1969 to 1976 he was the US Official Deputy Assistant Postmaster General, where he helped "convert the Post Office from a government department into the quasi-private U.S. Postal Service." Back then, he told Newsday, "you could make a deal in the government. We went up more times to see old Gale McGee, [D-WY, chairman of the Senate Post Office Committee]. He went down under some stairway, we had a drink in the middle of the day, and we talked about Wyoming and then they'd all cuss and swear and tell stories and then, the deal gets fixed."

"We don't do that anymore," he added. "You've got to go through the chairman, but you've got to go through all the plays. You don't just do it with lobbyists, you gotta do it from back home. In the past, if a couple of party leaders didn't want you to do your deal, you were dead in the water. That's not true anymore. So, now we can say, `Well, that's great, Mr. Chairman. We have great respect for you. How about lunch on the 30th and great, that'd be great. Meanwhile we're going to go beat the crap out of you. And go to all your guys and get their votes.' You can roll a chairman now. Or other chairmen will help you roll 'em."

In 1976 he joined the development department of the US Chamber of Commerce under its president, Richard Lesher. By 1978, his role included running "a grassroots political apparatus" and "relations with the White House and Congress". “Donohue was a guy who was there—you could feel him. He got the members to get very aggressively behind the president,” said Wayne Valis, a special assistant to President Reagan.

In 1984 he left to become President and CEO of the American Trucking Association, "quickly turning what was a moribund also-ran into a Washington powerhouse" according to the Washington Monthly.

In 1997 he returned to the Chamber as its President.

Donohue is an Emeritus Hudson Institute Trustee and has served on the board of directors of Qwest (2001-2005), Sunrise Assisted Living Corporation (1995-2013), Union Pacific (1998-2014), and XM (1999-2008).

Chamber of Commerce 

Under Lesher, the Chamber had endorsed the Clinton health care plan of 1993, angering many conservatives. Congressman John Boehner led a campaign pushing companies to leave the Chamber over its support of the bill. When Donohue took over, the Chamber's power was considered to be at a low ebb.

But, as the New York Times has written, “through Mr. Donohue’s efforts, the Chamber has become the most visible and effective business lobby in the country.” “It’s fair to say that we disagree on most things,” former Clinton chief-of-staff John Podesta told the Times. “But he took a kind of sleepy organization and turned it into one of the most aggressive lobbying groups in town.”

The Washington Post wrote "Nobody has mastered this new Washington game better than Thomas J. Donohue." "Tom is a bodacious, hard-charging, in-your-face kind of guy, which is not the style you see in Washington much anymore," W. Henson Moore of the American Forest and Paper Association told the Post. He calls Donohue the George Patton of the trade association world. "Tom Donohue threatens, cajoles, badgers—whatever it takes to get what he wants," consumer activist Joan Claybrook said.

According to the Wall Street Journal, "[Donohue's] most striking innovation has been to offer individual companies and industries the chance to use the chamber as a means of anonymously pursuing their own political ends." Major corporations donate funds to the Chamber, earmarked for particular political topics, and the Chamber spends them under its own name. Furthermore, "[t]hose companies helped the chamber raise $35 million in 2000 for general operations, up sharply from $3 million four years ago, and kicked in another $20 million for special projects."

Donohue established the U.S. Chamber Institute for Legal Reform, which has won significant cases in the courts, at the state and federal levels, and in elections for state attorneys general and Supreme Court judges. 

Donohue is president of the National Chamber Foundation as well as the Center for International Private Enterprise, a core institution of the National Endowment for Democracy.

In 2014, Donohue said that if the Republicans didn't change their immigration policies then they "shouldn't bother to run a candidate in 2016".

Post-Chamber of Commerce Career 
In July 2022, Donohue helped found a group of U.S. business and policy leaders who share the goal of constructively engaging with China in order to improve U.S.-China relations.

Honors 
Tom Donohue is a 2013 recipient of the Horatio Alger Award. In April 2016, he received a Lifetime Achievement Award from the Boy Scouts of America's National Capital Area Council.
  Grand Cordon of the Order of the Rising Sun: 2018

References

External links 

 
 

1938 births
Living people
American chief executives
Businesspeople from New York City
People from Brooklyn
United States Chamber of Commerce people
Grand Cordons of the Order of the Rising Sun
Hudson Institute